Courtney Sims (born October 21, 1983) is an American former professional basketball player. He is a 6'11" (211 cm) tall center.

Early career
Sims played his college ball at the University of Michigan, graduating in 2007, and previously attended the Noble & Greenough School for his high school education. With the Wolverines, he averaged 9.5 points and 5.5 rebounds in his four-year career.

Professional career
Sims played briefly for the NBA's Indiana Pacers in 2007–08. Signed to a non-guaranteed contract after going undrafted, he appeared in only two games for the Pacers before being waived on December 4, 2007. He was signed again on December 12, and waived again on December 19. Going scoreless in three total games, he had one rebound, one assist and committed two personal fouls in eleven minutes of action.
On February 25, 2008, Sims was acquired by the NBA Development League's Iowa Energy. He played for the New Orleans Hornets during the 2008–09 NBA pre-season. With the Energy, he registered a rare triple-double on November 28, 2008, in a 113–101 win over the Sioux Falls Skyforce with 22 points, 17 rebounds and 11 blocked 
shots. On December 28, he scored a season-high 36 points, including 13 in the last quarter, to go along with 16 rebounds in a 107–101 victory over the Utah Flash.
On January 20, 2009, the Phoenix Suns officially announced they signed Sims to a 10-day contract. He was signed to a second ten-day contract on February 14, but was released by the Arizona club upon the expiration of this contract, as the third would 
immediately mean his signing until the end of the season. Sims signed another ten-day 
contract on March 23, 2009, this time with the New York Knicks, and signed a second on April 2. On December 27 he was signed by CSKA Moscow until the end of season with a club option to terminate the contract after one-month trial period. On January 12, 2010, Sims was replaced in CSKA's lineup by Pops Mensah-Bonsu.

Sims then returned to the Iowa Energy, but then bought out his contract so that he could play in Puerto Rico for the Capitanes de Arecibo.

Sims was invited to attend the Denver Nuggets 2010 pre-season training camp, but was waived on October 11.

Sims signed with the Iowa Energy prior to the beginning of the 2010-11 NBA Development League Season. In the 2011 D-League All-star game, he scored 25 points and had 6 rebounds to earn the game MVP honors.

In March 2011 he signed with the Dongguan Leopards in China.

In September 2011 he signed a one-year deal with BK VEF Rīga.

In July 2012 he signed a one-year deal with Jeonju KCC Egis.

NBA career statistics

Regular season 

|-
| style="text-align:left;"| 
| style="text-align:left;"| Indiana
| 3 || 0 || 3.7 || .000 || .000 || .000 || .7 || .3 || .0 || .0 || .0
|-
| style="text-align:left;"| 
| style="text-align:left;"| Phoenix
| 1 || 0 || 2.0 || .000 || .000 || .000 || .0 || .0 || .0 || .0 || .0
|-
| style="text-align:left;"| 
| style="text-align:left;"| New York
| 1 || 0 || 11.0 || .500 || .000 || .000 || 4.0 || .0 || .0 || .0 || 6.0
|- class="sortbottom"
| style="text-align:center;" colspan="2"| Career
| 5 || 0 || 4.8 || .429 || .000 || .000 || 1.2 || .2 || .0 || .0 || 1.2

References

External links
NBA.com profile
NBA Development League playerfile
RealGM profile

1983 births
Living people
American expatriate basketball people in Belgium
American expatriate basketball people in China
American expatriate basketball people in Japan
American expatriate basketball people in Latvia
American expatriate basketball people in Russia
American expatriate basketball people in South Korea
American men's basketball players
Baloncesto Superior Nacional players
Basketball players from Boston
BK VEF Rīga players
Suwon KT Sonicboom players
Capitanes de Arecibo players
Centers (basketball)
Indiana Pacers players
Iowa Energy players
Jeonju KCC Egis players
Michigan Wolverines men's basketball players
New York Knicks players
Noble and Greenough School alumni
PBC CSKA Moscow players
Phoenix Suns players
SeaHorses Mikawa players
Seoul SK Knights players
Shenzhen Leopards players
Spirou Charleroi players
Undrafted National Basketball Association players
People from Roslindale